The Jelly Roll Joys is an album by jazz pianist Dave Burrell. It was recorded in 1990 and released in 1991 by Gazell Records.

Reception 

AllMusic gushes for this album, commenting that Burrell has contributed some "utterly gorgeous compositions." Reviewer Brian Olewnick states that this album is "highly recommended both as a wonderful recital and as one of the most rewarding albums by a musician deserving far greater renown."

Track listing
"The Pearls" (Morton) — 6:32
"New Orleans Blues" (Morton) — 4:09
"Billy's Bounce" (Parker) — 2:01
"Spanish Swat" (Morton) — 6:45
"Giant Steps" (Coltrane) — 2:06
"Freakish" (Morton) — 6:32
"A.M. Rag" (Burrell) — 3:01
"Popolo Paniolo" (Burrell) — 2:59
"The Crave" (Morton) — 4:39
"Moment's Notice" (Coltrane) — 4:34

Personnel 
Dave Burrell — piano
Glenn Barratt — engineer
Nora Charters — photography
Samuel Charters — producer, liner notes

References 

1991 albums
Dave Burrell albums
Solo piano jazz albums